U-111 may refer to one of the following German submarines:

 , a Type U 93 submarine launched in 1917 that served in the First World War and was surrendered in 1918
 During the First World War, Germany also had this submarine with a similar name:
 , a Type UB III submarine launched in 1917 and was surrendered in 1918
 , a Type IXB submarine that served in the Second World War and sank in 1941

See also
U-111 (disambiguation)

Submarines of Germany